The 1864 West Suffolk by-election was held in the United Kingdom on 8 December 1864 when the incumbent Conservative MP, Frederick Hervey became the Marquess of Bristol and so had to resign his seat in the House of Commons.  His brother Lord Augustus Hervey, also a Conservative, was elected unopposed.  He was returned again at the next three general elections, and held the seat until his death in 1875.

References

Unopposed by-elections to the Parliament of the United Kingdom in English constituencies
1864 elections in the United Kingdom
West
December 1864 events
1864 in England